is the 33rd single by Japanese entertainer Akina Nakamori. Written by Toshihiko Takamizawa and Tetsuya Komuro, the single was released on August 7, 1996, by MCA Victor. It was also the lead single from her 17th studio album Shaker.

Background 
"Moonlight Shadow: Tsuki ni Hoero" was Nakamori's second single collaboration with musician and composer Tetsuya Komuro, after her 1994 single "Aibu". The lyrics were written by Toshihiko Takamizawa of The Alfee. Following the release of this single, Komuro planned to produce an album for Nakamori, with a release date of October 1996, but this did not materialize.

Chart performance 
"Moonlight Shadow: Tsuki ni Hoero" peaked at No. 14 on Oricon's weekly singles chart and sold over 112,500 copies. It was also Nakamori's last single to be certified Gold by the RIAJ.

Track listing 
All lyrics are written by Toshihiko Takamizawa; all music is composed and arranged by Tetsuya Komuro.

Charts

Certification

References

External links 
 
 

1996 singles
1996 songs
Akina Nakamori songs
Japanese-language songs
Songs written by Tetsuya Komuro
Universal Music Japan singles
MCA Records singles